Alex Akingbulu (born December 28, 1997) is an American football offensive tackle for the Washington Commanders of the National Football League (NFL). He played college football at Fresno State and UCLA. Akingbulu has also been a member of the Philadelphia Stars.

References 

Living people
1997 births
American football offensive tackles
Fresno State Bulldogs football players
Washington Commanders players
Philadelphia Stars (2022) players